Cyclodecapentaene or [10]annulene is an annulene with molecular formula C10H10. This organic compound is a conjugated 10 pi electron cyclic system and according to Huckel's rule it should display aromaticity. It is not aromatic, however, because various types of ring strain destabilize an all-planar geometry. The all-cis isomer (1), a fully convex decagon, would have bond angles of 144°, which creates large amounts of angle strain relative to the ideal 120° for sp2 atomic hybridization. Instead, the all-cis isomer can adopt a planar boat-like conformation (2) to relieve the angle strain. This is still unstable because of the relative higher strain in boat shaped  compared to the next planar trans, cis, trans, cis, cis isomer (3). Yet even this isomer is also unstable, suffering from steric repulsion between the two internal hydrogen atoms. The nonplanar trans, cis, cis, cis, cis isomer (4) is the most stable of all the possible isomers.

The [10]annulene compound can be obtained by photolysis of cis-9,10-dihydronaphthalene as a mixture of isomers. Because of their lack in stability even at low temperatures the reaction products revert to the original dihydronaphthalene.

Aromaticity can be induced in compounds having a [10]annulene-type core by fixation of the planar geometries. There exist two methods to bring it about. One way is to replace two hydrogen atoms by a methylene bridge (--) gives the planar bicyclic 1,6-methano[10]annulene (5). This compound is aromatic as indicated by from lack in bond length alternation seen in its X-ray structure and evidence of telltale diamagnetic ring current in its NMR spectrum.

A classical organic synthesis of this compound starts from a Birch reduction of naphthalene to tetrahydronaphthalene (or isotetralin), is followed by carbene addition of dichlorocarbene (prepared in-situ from chloroform and the potassium salt of tert-butanol) followed by a second organic reduction that removes the chloride substituents and is concluded by the organic oxidation by 2,3-dichloro-5,6-dicyano-1,4-benzoquinone (DDQ).

Another way to restore planarity, and therefore aromaticity, in [10]annulene rings is incorporation of a methine bridge to a tricyclic[10]annulene core structure (6). When deprotonated to form the anion this type of compound is even more stabilized. The central carbanion makes the molecule even more planar and the number of resonance structures that can be drawn is extended to 7 included two resonance forms with a complete benzene ring. By computational chemistry it is demonstrated that the tricyclic[10]annulene derivative with an annulated benzene ring and a full set of cyano substituents (7) is one of the most acidic compounds known with a computed pKa in DMSO of −30.4 (compared to for instance −20 for magic acid).

Azulene is also a 10 π-electron system in which aromaticity is maintained by direct transannular bonding to form a fused 7–5 bicyclic molecule.

References 

Annulenes
Fully conjugated nonaromatic rings
Ten-membered rings